Here I Go may refer to:
"Here I Go" (2 Unlimited song)
"Here I Go" (Syd Barrett song)
"Here I Go" (The Screaming Jets song)
"Here I Go" (Infamous Syndicate song)
"Here I Go", a song by Public Enemy from There's a Poison Goin' On
"Here I Go", a demo by Relient K from The Bird and the Bee Sides
"Here I Go", a song by Mystikal from Mind of Mystikal
"Here I Go", a song by American rapper Kash Doll from The Vault

See also
Here I Go Again (disambiguation)
Here We Go (disambiguation)
"There I Go", single by Vaughn Monroe
Toadette, character who says the quote